The Ministry of Science and Education of the Republic of Azerbaijan is a governmental agency within the Cabinet of Azerbaijan in charge of regulating the education system in Azerbaijan.

History

The Education Ministry was one of the government agencies established on May 18, 1918, when the Azerbaijan Democratic Republic declared independence. The first agency, named the Ministry of Public Enlightenment, consisted of three departments: General Secondary Education, Higher and Secondary Specialized Education, Vocational Schools. The Council of Ministers of Azerbaijan approved the motion on June 30, 1920. 

After Soviet rule was established in Azerbaijan on April 28, 1920, the ministry was transformed into the Commissariat of Public Enlightenment by Decree No. 1 of the Council of Ministers of Azerbaijan SSR, bringing all educational institutions in the republic under its direct supervision. In 1940, the Council of Ministers approved the creation of a separate government agency, the Department of Labour Reserves, which would oversee the activities of vocational institutions. In 1959, the authorities transformed the entity into the State Committee of Vocational Education, which functioned until 1988. In 1959, the Council of Ministers also approved the establishment of the Committee of Higher and Secondary Special Education, transferring all institutions of secondary and higher education under its control, which from 1964 until 1988 acted as an independent government agency. In 1988, all education agencies were abolished by decree of the Council of Ministers, and the Ministry of National Education was founded in their place. The ministry was reorganized into the Ministry of Education by presidential order on September 3, 1993. The ministry regulations were approved by presidential decree dated March 1, 2005. In 2013 Mikayil Cabbarov was appointed the minister of education.

According to the Decree of the President of the Republic of Azerbaijan, H.E. Ilham Aliyev "On some measures to improve the management in the field of science and education in the Republic of Azerbaijan" dated July 28, 2022 the Ministry of Education of the Republic of Azerbaijan was renamed to Ministry of Science and Education of the Republic of Azerbaijan in order to strengthen the science and education interaction and to improve management in these fields.

Structure
The ministry is headed by the minister and three deputy ministers. There is also a separate Education Department for Baku. The functions of the ministry include but are not limited to enforcing government procedures and policies in the education sector, determining the development concepts of the education system of Azerbaijan and preparation of government programs for their realization; protection of rights of citizens to receive proper education, create conditions for equality in educational institutions; ensuring quality of the education given to citizens of the country; creation of economic and organizational models according to modern standards; enforce democratic mechanisms in the management; forecast the workforce demand markets in education of specialized professionals; increasing scientific and procedural potential in educational institutions; organization and development of international relations in the education sector and so forth. Currently there are 36 state-run and 15 private universities in Azerbaijan. The ministry-released reports state that in 2009 20,953 undergraduate students and 3,526 graduate students entered in universities nationwide. Currently, there are 104,925 undergraduate and graduate students, studying in higher education institutions, excluding the specialized higher education schools. Universities employ 11,566 professors and 12,616 faculty members in the country.

Statement

The functions of the Ministry 
The Ministry of Science and Education of Azerbaijan is responsible for carrying out a state policy related to education, to prepare education development concept, to prepare and implement perspective programs, to protect citizens` education rights and monitoring the education institutions and the. The ministry should organize cooperation with the international educational institutions, relevant foreign state bodies and organizations operating in the field of education and develop the relations.

The rights of the Ministry 
The ministry has the rights to prepare educational legal acts, to make proposals on their improvement, to issue decrees, orders and to recruit and dismiss employees under the law "On the state service" and nomenclatures, to awards the employees working in the field of education, as well as to take measures to encourage them. The ministry may require information and references from relevant executive bodies, organizations operating in the field of education, monitor all the educational institutions in Azerbaijan. Issuing and eliminating licenses for the educational activity also include the rights of the ministry. In parallel the Ministry of Education of Azerbaijan may represent Azerbaijan in the international educational events, relations and it has right to sign contracts and memorandums with relevant foreign state bodies, as well as international organization operating in the field of education.

International relations 
The international relations of the Ministry of Education of Azerbaijan are mainly in the directions on the student and master exchange, joining scientific researches and international educational programs.

The ministry joined the international conventions on education and cooperates with international organizations such as Council of Europe and the European Union (EU), UNESCO, UNICEF, ISESCO, European Education Foundation. Azerbaijani universities joined TEMPUS/TASIS program funded by European Union.

Twenty-one projects amounting to 4.4 million euros and covering 16 educational institutions in Azerbaijan have been implemented within the framework of the TEMPUS program. With the financial support of this program, measures on student exchange, specialist preparation, organization of internships for teachers abroad, provision of higher education institutions with technologies and teaching equipment have been carried out in the Baku State University, the Azerbaijan State Economic University, the Academy of Public Administration under the president of the Republic of Azerbaijan, the Azerbaijan State Oil Academy, the Azerbaijan University of Languages, the Azerbaijan University of Architecture and Construction , as well as the Western University, and Khazar University.

"Early Childhood Care Initiative with the Better Parenting”, "Active Learning School Leadership", "Teaching and Learning about Child Rights", “Development of information and analysis in the education system"," Young People's Health & Development", "Creation of Parent/teacher Association" and "Mine Risk Education" programs have been implemented within the framework of the Cooperation Program signed between the Government of Azerbaijan and UNICEF, between 2000 and 2004. Totally 1.5 million dollars has been spent within the framework of these programs.

In parallel the Ministry of Education cooperates with China, Great Britain, Japan, USA, France, Kazakhstan, Germany, Russia, Israel, South Korea, the Kingdom of Saudi Arabia, Turkey, Iran, Egypt, India, Georgia, Ukraine, Moldova, Czech, Uzbekistan, and Poland in the field of education and the leadership of the ministry visit these countries within the framework of the education programs carried out jointly with these countries.

The Ministry of Education joined Paris Convention of UNESCO (1979) and about the recognition of diplomas of higher education and scientific degrees in the European states and in the Asian and Pacific Ocean states. It also joined Lisbon convention (1997) about the recognition of higher education specialties in Europe.

The Ministry of Education of Azerbaijan cooperates with World Bank since 1999. A number of projects have been implemented within the framework of this cooperation. One of these projects is Second Education Sector Development Project. The project amounting to 45.4 million dollars (25 million dollars by World Bank and 20.4 million dollars by the Government of Azerbaijan) was carried out between 2009 and 2016. The main aim of the project that covers 3 phases and 6 components is to improve the effectiveness of teaching and learning conditions.

Protocols and contracts 

 Ministry of Education of Azerbaijan signed a protocol with the Ministry of Education of Turkey in the field of education and science on November 4, 1998; 
 A Protocol on education was signed between the Ministry of Education of Azerbaijan and the British Council on May 22, 1998;
 The Government of Azerbaijan signed an agreement with Kazakhstan on cooperation on training scientific and teaching specialists on April 7, 2000
 Ministry of Education of Azerbaijan signed a contract on cooperation in the field of education with the Ministry of Education of China in 2002;
 A protocol on cooperation in the field of education, and a contract on the mutual recognition of the educational diplomas and certificates were signed between Russian and Azerbaijan on September 22, 2002; 
 Ministry of Education of Azerbaijan signed a memorandum of cooperation on education and researches with the Ministry of Research and Technology of Iran on May 20, 2002; 
 Ministry of Education of Azerbaijan signed contract on cooperation on education with American Councils for the International Education (ACTR/ACCELS) on May 9, 2001;
 A memorandum of Mutual Understanding was signed between the Ministry of Federal Education, Science and Culture of Austria and the Ministry of Education of Azerbaijan in October 2004;
 A contract on cooperation in the field of education was signed between the Ministry of Education of Education of the GUAM member-states and Azerbaijan in July, 2003;
 A contract on cooperation was signed between the Ministry of Education of Azerbaijan and the Ministry of Education and Science of Georgia in March 2004;
 A contract on cooperation was signed between the Ministry of Education of Azerbaijan and the Ministry of Education and Research of Romania in October, 2004;
 A contract on cooperation in the field of education was signed between Azerbaijan and the Asian Development Bank (ADB) on November 9, 2004.

Publications

The Ministry of Education publishes the Azerbaijan Journal of Educational Studies, a quarterly peer-reviewed open-access academic journal. Articles are published in Azerbaijani, Russian, English, Turkish.  It was originally established in 1924 as New School, and was renamed Help to Teacher in 1930, before obtaining its current name in 1943.

See also
Cabinet of Azerbaijan
Education in Azerbaijan

References

External links
Education Portal of Azerbaijan Republic
Overview of Education System in Azerbaijan as provided by World Higher Education Database

Education in Azerbaijan
Education
Azerbaijan